Mark Guy (born January 28, 1964) is a former American football wide receiver who played three seasons in the Canadian Football League with the Saskatchewan Roughriders and Calgary Stampeders. He played college football at University of Tennessee at Martin. He was also a member of the Detroit Drive of the Arena Football League.

Professional career

Saskatchewan Roughriders
Guy signed with the Saskatchewan Roughriders in March 1989. He played in seven games for the Roughriders during the 1989 season, catching seven passes for 144 yards and one touchdown. He also recorded four receptions for 100 yards in the 77th Grey Cup, a 43-40 win over the Hamilton Tiger-Cats on November 26, 1989. Guy totaled 29 receptions for 328 yards and two touchdowns in twelve games for the Roughriders in 1990. He was later released by the team.

Calgary Stampeders
Guy was then signed by the Calgary Stampeders in June 1991. He caught 16	passes for 264 yards and one touchdown in seven games for the team during the 1991 season. He also had 29 punt returns for 401 yards.

Detroit Drive
On July 1, 1992, the Detroit Free Press reported that Guy had signed with the Detroit Drive. He recorded three receptions for 29 yards for the team during the 1992 season. He also accumulated four tackles, three pass breakups and one fumble recovery that was returned for a touchdown. The Drive won ArenaBowl VI against the Orlando Predators by a score of 56-38 on August 22, 1992.

References

External links
Just Sports Stats

Living people
1964 births
American football wide receivers
Canadian football wide receivers
African-American players of American football
African-American players of Canadian football
UT Martin Skyhawks football players
Saskatchewan Roughriders players
Calgary Stampeders players
Detroit Drive players
Players of American football from Mississippi
People from Olive Branch, Mississippi
21st-century African-American people
20th-century African-American sportspeople